Pedro Victor Delmino da Silva (born 13 April 1998), known as Pedrinho, is a Brazilian professional footballer who plays as an attacking midfielder for Campeonato Brasileiro Série A club Atlético Mineiro, on loan from Ukrainian Premier League club Shakhtar Donetsk.

Club career

Early career
Pedrinho joined Corinthians in 2013, after a brief stint at Vitória. He was part of the 2016 Copa São Paulo de Futebol Júnior and 2016 U20 Campeonato Brasileiro squads that ended up as runner up in both tournaments. The following year, he was chosen as the best player of the 2017 Copa São Paulo de Futebol Júnior, in which Corinthians won its tenth title.

Corinthians
Pedrinho made his official debut as a substitute during the second half of a 1–0 defeat against Ferroviária on 19 March 2017.

Benfica
On 11 March 2020, S.L. Benfica reported that they had signed Pedrinho for €20 million, on a contract until 2025. The player would remain with Corinthians until the opening of the Portuguese transfer market.

Shakhtar Donetsk
On 9 June 2021, Benfica announced he was sold for 18 million euros to the Ukrainian Premier League side Shakhtar Donetsk. On 13 June 2021, Pedrinho signed five years contract with Ukrainian club.

Loan to Atlético Mineiro
On 30 June 2022, Atlético Mineiro announced an agreement with Shakhtar for the signing of Pedrinho on a one-year loan.

Career statistics

Honours
Corinthians
Campeonato Brasileiro Série A: 2017
Campeonato Paulista: 2017, 2018, 2019

Shakhtar Donetsk
Ukrainian Super Cup: 2021

Brazil U23
Toulon Tournament: 2019

References

1998 births
Living people
People from Maceió
Brazilian footballers
Association football forwards
Sport Club Corinthians Paulista players
S.L. Benfica footballers
FC Shakhtar Donetsk players
Clube Atlético Mineiro players
Campeonato Brasileiro Série A players
Primeira Liga players
Ukrainian Premier League players
Brazilian expatriate footballers
Expatriate footballers in Portugal
Expatriate footballers in Ukraine
Brazilian expatriate sportspeople in Ukraine
Sportspeople from Alagoas